Nona is a 2017 American drama film directed by Michael Polish, starring Sulem Calderon, Jesy McKinney, Jasper Polish and Kate Bosworth.

Cast
 Sulem Calderon as Nona
 Jesy McKinney as Hecho
 Jasper Polish as Marty
 Kate Bosworth as Detective
 Giancarlo Ruiz as Billy
 Lilly Melgar as Madame Mariposa

Reception
Lorry Kikta of Film Threat gave the film a score of 8/10 and wrote that the film "flies by in an hour and a half but somehow manages to encapsulate so much emotional truth and heartbreaking beauty over its short runtime."

Nick Allen of RogerEbert.com rated the film 2.5 stars out of 4, writing that the film "struggles with a vital balance of Nona’s intimate perspective, and Polish’s desire to create atmosphere with an outsider's eye."

Dennis Harvey of Variety wrote that the film "greatly improves if you view it not as a problematic, lopsided attempt to convey the personal danger and political urgency of current migration trends, but as a small, impressionistic two-character piece that veers earnestly if misguidedly into larger issues in its closing lap."

References

External links
 
 

American drama films
2017 drama films